In the Water is an oil on panel by Eugene de Blaas of a nude young woman. It is the only nude painted by de Blaas — all his other subjects are fully clothed. The picture measures 78.4cm by 44.5cm.

The painting depicts a naked young woman standing up to mid-ankle in water, leaning forward, looking down at a school of tiny fish. She has a rosy complexion, and her curly, dark brown hair is tied back.

Although there is no sun in the composition, golden light shines through the cloudy sky and reflects on the water. There is land in the background, with a patch of greenery to the right.

The artist signed his name and the date (1914) in dark ink, at the lower-left corner of the composition.

References

Nude art
1914 paintings
Paintings by Eugene de Blaas
Female beauty
Bathing in art
Fish in art